They Call Us Monsters is a 2016 American documentary directed and produced by Ben Lear. The film follows three juveniles: Juan Gamez, Antonio Hernandez and Jarad Nava. The teenagers participate in a screenwriting class at Barry J. Nidorf Juvenile Hall in Los Angeles, California with producer Gabriel Cowan.

Premise
The documentary follows three young juvenile offenders who signed up for a screenwriting class with producer Gabriel Cowan as they await their respective trials in Los Angeles County. Arrested at 16, Jarad faces 200 years-to-life for four attempted murders; Juan, also arrested at 16, faces 90-to-life for first-degree murder; Antonio was arrested at 14 and faces 90-to-life for two attempted murders.

References

American documentary films
2016 films
Documentary films about children
Documentary films about crime in the United States
Documentary films about incarceration in the United States
Films set in Los Angeles
Juvenile justice system
2010s English-language films
2010s American films